Naked Maja may refer to:

 La maja desnuda, a painting by Francisco Goya
 Naked Maja (postage stamps), a series of Spanish postage stamps depicting the painting
 The Naked Maja, a 1958 film